Vaughan Hart is a leading architectural historian, and Professor Emeritus of Architecture in the Department of Architecture and Civil Engineering at the University of Bath. He served as head of department between 2008 and 2010.

Biography

Hart was born in Ireland in 1960 and spent part of his childhood in Hong Kong. He studied architecture at Bath and Cambridge Universities (Trinity Hall), where he was taught by Michael Brawne, Patrick Hodgkinson, Peter Smithson, Ted Happold and Dalibor Vesely. Smithson was his final year undergraduate tutor, and part of Hart's student project was exhibited in the 1986 Royal Academy Summer Exhibition where it won the RA Student Prize. Between 1985-86 he worked as an architectural assistant to Sir Colin St John Wilson on the British Library project in London, and one of his drawings of the entrance hall is now in the RIBA drawing's collection at the V&A in London. Hart then moved to Cambridge to teach in Wilson’s unit and study for a doctorate on Inigo Jones under Joseph Rykwert. Hart's thesis formed the basis for his first book, on the art and architecture of the Stuart Court, published by Routledge in 1994.

Publications 

Hart's concerns lie in particular with the symbolic function of architecture, and with the sources and meaning of architectural forms. He has published widely in the field of architectural history, specialising in the Italian architectural treatises and in British architectural history of the Renaissance and Baroque periods. He is the co-translator (with Peter Hicks) of the treatises of Sebastiano Serlio, funded by the Getty Grants Programme and The Graham Foundation for Advanced Studies in the Fine Arts, and he has also translated the two guidebooks to Rome published by Andrea Palladio and the guidebook to Venice by Francesco Sansovino (2017). These works were all published by Yale University Press, and have in turn been translated into Chinese and Japanese. Hart's translation of these classic works formed part of a wider project initiated by Rykwert and Robert Tavernor through their translation of the treatise by Leon Battista Alberti. In addition, Hart's monographs include influential studies of the work of Inigo Jones, Sir Christopher Wren, Sir John Vanbrugh and Nicholas Hawksmoor, all published by Yale University Press for The Paul Mellon Centre for Studies in British Art. The latter monograph was awarded the Best Book on British Art Prize of the American College Art Association in 2004.

Exhibitions 

In 1997 Hart was the curator of an exhibition entitled 'Paper Palaces: Architectural books from 1472 to 1800 in the collection of Cambridge University Library'. This consisted of architectural prints, manuscripts and over 140 rare books and incunabula, and was held in the Adeane Gallery of the Fitzwilliam Museum in Cambridge. It was opened by the Duke of Gloucester. In 2008 he co-organised (with Peter Hicks and Alan Day) an exhibition entitled 'Palladio's Rome' held at the British School at Rome, and in 2009 he co-organised (again with Hicks and Day) an exhibition of research work held at the Réfectoire des Cordeliers at the Sorbonne, Paris. Along with Tavernor, Hart has pioneered the use of the computer to visualise lost buildings and investigate historic forms. In 2002 he was funded by the AHRC to build a computer model of Hawksmoor's work in the city of Oxford. His computer work has been displayed in the 1993 and 1995 Royal Academy Summer Exhibitions, in the National Theatre Museum at Covent Garden, the George Peabody Library at Johns Hopkins University in Baltimore, and in the ‘Nelson and Napoleon’ exhibition held at the National Maritime Museum, London, in July 2005.

Teaching and Fellowships 

Vaughan Hart has lectured in many schools of architecture throughout the world, and his graduate students hold academic and museum posts in Australia, Sweden and the UK. Hart has held visiting posts as a senior fellow of the Paul Mellon Centre for Studies in British Art in 2005, and as a visiting scholar at St John's College, Oxford in the same year. In 2009 he was Ailsa Mellon Bruce Visiting Senior Fellow at the National Gallery of Art in Washington, D.C. He was a visiting professor at Kent University. He served on the AHRC Peer Review College from 2011 to 2016. He was a trustee of the Holburne Museum in Bath from 2011 to 2016 and a member of the advisory board of the Helsinki Collegium for Advanced Studies, an independent research institute within the University of Helsinki, Finland, from 2012 to 2017. He served as the assistant honorary secretary and trustee of the Oriental Ceramic Society between 2014 and 2019.

Publications (selection)
 Art and Magic in the Court of the Stuarts (Routledge, 1994; eBook 2002; paperback edition 2014)
 St Paul's Cathedral: Christopher Wren (Phaidon, 1995; hardback edition 1999)
 Sebastiano Serlio on Architecture (with Peter Hicks, Yale University Press, 2 vols.: vol.1, 1996 (paperback edition 2005; Chinese edition, China Architecture and Building Press, 2014) and vol.2, 2001 (Chinese edition, China Architecture and Building Press, 2019))
 Paper Palaces: the Rise of the Renaissance Architectural Treatise (with Peter Hicks, Yale University Press, 1998)
 Nicholas Hawksmoor: Rebuilding Ancient Wonders (Yale University Press, 2002: awarded the Best Book on British Art Prize of the American College Art Association in 2003; paperback edition 2007)
 Palladio's Rome (with Peter Hicks, Yale University Press, 2006; paperback edition, 2009; Japanese edition, Hakusuisha Co. Ltd., 2011)
 Sir John Vanbrugh: Storyteller in Stone (Yale University Press, 2008: shortlisted in 2008 by the Authors’ Club for the Banister Fletcher Book Prize)
 Inigo Jones: the Architect of Kings (Yale University Press, 2011: shortlisted in 2012 for the William M. B. Berger Prize for British Art History, the British Art Book Prize and Apollo Magazine's Book of the Year; shortlisted in 2013 for the Best Book on British Art by the Historians of British Art)
 Sansovino's Venice (with Peter Hicks, Yale University Press, 2017)
 'Navel Gazing. On Albrecht Dürer's Adam and Eve (1504)', The International Journal of Arts Theory and History, 2016, vol.12.1 pp. 1–10 
 Myth and Modernism: Essays on the Quest for Spiritual Architecture in the Early Twentieth Century (Kindle Direct Publishing, 2019)
 Christopher Wren: In Search of Eastern Antiquity (Yale University Press, 2020)

 Photographs of Hawksmoor's buildings taken by Hart are held in the Conway Library of art and architecture, The Courtauld.

References

British architecture writers
Alumni of the University of Bath
Academics of the University of Bath
Living people
Year of birth missing (living people)